Ocotea uxpanapana is a species of plant in the family Lauraceae. It is a species of evergreen tree in the genus Ocotea.

It is endemic to Veracruz state in eastern Mexico.

References

uxpanapana
Endemic flora of Mexico
Flora of Veracruz
Trees of Mexico
Taxonomy articles created by Polbot